The 2021 Bhutan Premier League was the tenth season of the unified league, rebranded as the Bhutan Premier League since 2019 (previously the Bhutan National League), the top national football competition in Bhutan, having replaced the A-Division in 2013.

Teams

Stadiums and locations

League table

References

External links
Facebook page of Bhutan Football Federation
Facebook page of Bhutan Premier League
RSSSF

Bhutan National League seasons
Bhutan
1